Cobblestone Records was an American jazz record label founded by Joe Fields in New York City in 1972.

Cobblestone had two successive incarnations. The earlier was in 1968–69 as a singles label, subsidiary of Buddah Records. (The Joe Thomas LP is drawn from that period.) The singles line went dormant in the early 1970s, until in 1972 a new version of the label was established by Joe Fields in New York City, also as a subsidiary label to Buddah.

Much of what was issued on the label was produced by Don Schlitten. Among the label's releases was a six-album issue of recordings from the Newport Jazz Festival New York of 1972. The label also released previously unissued recordings from Grant Green with Big John Patton.

In a move reflecting an active era of independent record labels, Fields later formed Muse Records, essentially an extension of Cobblestone's approach, with Schlitten producing the initial majority of the output. Later producers included Michael Cuscuna and Fred Seibert. Some of the label's material was later transferred to Muse Records and 32 Jazz.

Discography

Albums
7001: Joe Thomas – Comin' Home
9000: Hermeto Pascoal – Hermeto
9001: Elmore James – Southside Blues
9002: Grant Green – Iron City
9003: Richard Davis – The Philosophy of the Spiritual
9004: Freddie McCoy – Gimme Some!
9005: Neal Creque – Creque
9006: Eric Kloss – Doors
9007: Ruth Brown – The Real Ruth Brown
9008: Chuck Rainey – The Chuck Rainey Coalition
9009: Bob Freedman – Journeys of Odysseus
9010: The Visitors – Neptune
9011: Cedar Walton/Hank Mobley Quintet – Breakthrough!
9012: Jimmy Heath – The Gap Sealer
9013: Sonny Stitt – Tune–Up!
9014: Emanuel K. Rahim & the Kahliqs – Total Submission
9015: Pat Martino – The Visit!
9016: Bobby Pierce – Introducing Bobby Pierce With Bobby Jones
9017: Harold Ousley – The Kid
9018: Catalyst – Catalyst
9019: Gary McFarland – Requiem for Gary McFarland
9020: Steve Kuhn – Steve Kuhn Live in New York
9021: Sonny Stitt – Constellation
9022: Bobby Jones – The Arrival of Bobby Jones
9023: Neal Creque – Contrast!
9024: Norman Connors – Dance of Magic
9025: (Various) – Newport in New York '72: The Jam Sessions Vol 1 & 2
9026: (Various) – Newport in New York '72: The Jam Sessions Vol 3 & 4
9027: (Various) – Newport in New York '72 Vol 5: The Jimmy Smith Jam
9028: (Various) – Newport in New York '72 Vol 6: The Soul Sessions
9032: (Various) – Newport in New York '72
9035: Norman Connors – Dark of Light

References

American record labels
Jazz record labels